Vice-Admiral Maurice Frank Ronald "Ron" Lloyd  is a retired Royal Canadian Navy officer who became the 35th Commander of the Royal Canadian Navy on 23 June 2016.

Naval career
Educated at Royal Roads Military College, Lloyd joined the Royal Canadian Navy in 1985. He became commanding officer of the frigate HMCS Charlottetown in 2000 in which capacity he was deployed to the Persian Gulf. He became Executive Secretary to the Chief of Maritime Staff in 2002, commanding officer of the destroyer HMCS Algonquin in 2004 and Director General Maritime Force Development at National Defence Headquarters in Ottawa in 2006. He went on to be Commander Canadian Fleet – Atlantic in 2008, Commander Canadian Fleet – Pacific in March 2009 and Chief of Force Development in July 2010. In January 2016 it was announced that he would become Commander of the Royal Canadian Navy.

Lloyd was Acting Vice Chief of Defence Staff from January 13 to May 30, 2017, when Vice Admiral Mark Norman was relieved of his duties. He was subsequently replaced as Acting Vice Chief of Defence Staff by Lieutenant-General Alain Parent.

In February 2019, it was announced that he would retire and his replacement will be Vice-Admiral A.G. McDonald who will be promoted and become Commander of the Royal Canadian Navy.

Awards and decorations
Lloyd's personal awards and decorations include the following:
100px25px

110px

 He was a qualified Ship's Diver and as such wore the Canadian Forces Ship's Diver Badge
 He was a qualified Paratrooper and as such wore the Canadian Forces Jump Wings

Notes

References

Year of birth missing (living people)
Living people
Canadian admirals
Commanders of the Order of Military Merit (Canada)
Commanders of the Royal Canadian Navy